Little Chicago is an unincorporated community in Pickaway County, in the U.S. state of Ohio. The community has been incorporated into the Village of Ashville, Ohio.

History
The community was established as a railroad town. It was the area that surrounded the tracks of the then Scioto Valley Railway which has since become owned by Norfolk Southern Railway.

References

Unincorporated communities in Pickaway County, Ohio
Unincorporated communities in Ohio